John Daniel (1755? - 1823) was a Welsh printer. He is known to have been from the Carmarthenshire area, where his father was a farmer. Following an apprenticeship with John Ross of Carmarthen he moved to London to work for King's Printers. In 1784 however, he returned to Carmarthen where he set up a very successful business in King Street. In March 1810 he began the printing of the earlier issues of 'The Carmarthen Journal'. He is also thought, in 1797, to have been the first printer in Wales to print music in staff notation, when he produced 'Cyfaill mewn Llogell', by John Williams (1750? - 1807). Ifano Jones in his publication, 'History of Printing and Printers in Wales' refers to him as the best printer before the era of William Rees (of Llandovery), and William Spurrell (of Carmarthen).

References 

British printers
18th-century Welsh people
19th-century Welsh people
1755 births
1823 deaths